Darryl Baris Grant (born November 22, 1959) is a former professional American football player who played defensive tackle for eleven seasons for the Washington Redskins and the Tampa Bay Buccaneers of the National Football League (NFL). He played college football at Rice University.

Grant was drafted by the Redskins in the ninth round of the 1981 NFL Draft. The Redskins decided to turn him into a defensive lineman, even though he played offensive guard in college. After using his 1981 rookie year to adjust to the rigors of playing defensive tackle in the NFL, Grant joined the defensive line rotation starting in 1982.

Grant went on to become a fixture on Joe Gibbs' Redskins teams in the 1980s. At times paired alongside other Redskins defensive line standouts such as Dave Butz, Dexter Manley and Charles Mann, Grant was one of the contributors during a period (his Redskins career 1981–1990) that saw the Redskins make the playoffs six times, including three trips to the Super Bowl (two wins) and four conference championship appearances (three wins).

Career highlights
Grant intercepted a pass and returned it for a ten-yard touchdown in the 1982 NFC Championship game against the Dallas Cowboys, which the Redskins eventually won 31-17.

Grant went on to play in 141 games for the Redskins from 1981–90, finishing with 27 sacks and two interceptions. His best season was 1984 when he recorded a career-high eight sacks.

References

External links
 "Great Redskins Drafts: A Look At 1981"

1959 births
Living people
Players of American football from San Antonio
American football defensive tackles
Rice Owls football players
Washington Redskins players
Tampa Bay Buccaneers players
Ed Block Courage Award recipients